Erelieva quantulella is a species of snout moth. It was described by George Duryea Hulst in 1887. It is found in the south-eastern United States.

References

Moths described in 1887
Phycitinae